The United States Air Force's 485th Intelligence Squadron is an intelligence unit located at Mainz-Kastel, Germany.

Mission

History

Lineage
 85th Radio Squadron
 Constituted as the 85th Radio Squadron, Mobile on 4 August 1953
 Activated on 8 December 1953
 Inactivated on 8 May 1955
 Disbanded on 15 June 1983
 Reconstituted and consolidated with the 6985th Electronic Security Squadron as the 485th Intelligence Squadron on 10 May 1995

 485th Intelligence Squadron
 Designated as the 6985th Radio Squadron, Mobile and activated on 1 July 1962
 Redesignated 6985th Security Squadron on 1 July 1963
 Redesignated 6985 Electronic Security Squadron on 1 August 1979
 Inactivated on 30 June 1992
 Consolidated with the 6985th Electronic Security Squadron as the 485th Intelligence Squadron on 10 May 1995
 Activated on 1 July 1995

Assignments
 United States Air Force Security Service, 8 December 1953
 6910th Security Group, 19 May 1954 – 8 May 1955
 6981st Radio Group, Mobile (later 6981st Security Group), 1 July 1962
 6944th Security Wing, 1 July 1974
 United States Air Force Security Service (later Electronic Security Command), 1 March 1979
 6949th Electronic Security Group, 1 January 1980
 Electronic Security, Strategic, 1 August 1981
 Electronic Security, Alaska, 1 October 1983
 Pacific Electronic Security Division (later 692d Intelligence Wing), 1 June 1989 – 30 June 1992
 26th Intelligence Group (later 26th Information Operations Group), 1 July 1995
 70th Mission Support Group, 5 July 2006
 693d Intelligence Group (later 693d Intelligence, Surveillance and Reconnaissance Group), 12 July 2007 – present

Stations
 Mainz-Kastel, Germany, 1 July 1995 – present
 Eielson Air Force Base, Alaska, 1 July 1962 – 30 June 1992
 Sembach Air Base, Germany, 2 May 1954 – 8 May 1955
 Kelly Air Force Base, Texas, 8 December 1953 – 17 April 1954

Awards

References

Notes
 Explanatory notes

 Citations

Bibliography

External links
 Air Force ISR Agency

0485